Borzinsky District is an administrative and municipal district (raion), one of the thirty-one in Zabaykalsky Krai, Russia. It is located in the south of the krai, and borders with Olovyanninsky District in the north, Aleksandrovo-Zavodsky District in the east, Zabaykalsky District in the south, and with Ononsky District in the west. Its administrative center is the town of Borzya. Population:  25,095 (2002 Census);  The population of Borzya accounts for 60.8% of the district's total population.

History
The district was established on January 4, 1926.

References

Notes

Sources

Districts of Zabaykalsky Krai
States and territories established in 1926

